Lansdowne River, a watercourse of the Manning River catchment, is located in the Mid North Coast district of New South Wales, Australia.

Course and features
Lansdowne River rises below Mount Gibraltar in the Gibraltar Range, north northwest of Upper Lansdowne, and flows generally southeast before reaching its confluence with the Northern Arm of the Manning River, near Coopernook. The river descends  over its  course.

The Pacific Highway crosses the Lansdowne River south-east of Coopernook.

See also 

 Rivers of New South Wales
 List of rivers of New South Wales (L–Z)
 List of rivers of Australia

References

External links
 

Rivers of New South Wales
Mid North Coast
City of Greater Taree